Taichi Nakamura may refer to:

 Taichi Nakamura (footballer) (born 1993), Japanese football midfielder
 Taichi Nakamura (shogi) (born 1988), Japanese shogi player